Euan Smith (born 29 January 1994) is a Scottish semi-professional footballer who plays for as a midfielder for Spartans.

Career
After playing for Hibernian, and spending time on loan at Arbroath, Smith signed for Kilmarnock in August 2014. He spent time on loan at Clyde and also played for Brechin City, before signing for Berwick Rangers in June 2019. Smith signed a precontract with Spartans on 26 April 2021.

Career statistics

References

1994 births
Living people
Scottish footballers
Hibernian F.C. players
Arbroath F.C. players
Kilmarnock F.C. players
Clyde F.C. players
Brechin City F.C. players
Berwick Rangers F.C. players
Scottish Professional Football League players
Association football midfielders